Streptophlebia antipolo is a moth in the family Erebidae. It was described by Georg Semper in 1898. It is found in the Philippines.

References

Moths described in 1898
Syntomini